Elections were held in Renfrew County, Ontario on October 22, 2018 in conjunction with municipal elections across the province.

Renfrew County Council
County council has no direct elections; its membership is made up of the mayors and reeves of the lower-tier municipalities of the county (including the reeves - rather than mayors - of Deep River, Laurentian Valley, Renfrew and Whitewater Region), while Arnpror elects a separate councillor for county council. Therefore, elections in those municipalities determine the members of council for the new term.

Admaston Bromley

Arnprior

Source:

Bonnechere Valley

Brudenell, Lyndoch and Raglan

Source:

Deep River

Source:

Greater Madawaska

Source:

Head, Clara and Maria

Source:

Horton

Source:

Killaloe, Hagarty and Richards

Source:

Laurentian Hills

Source:

Laurentian Valley

Source:

Madawaska Valley

Source:

McNab/Braeside

Source:

North Algona Wilberforce

Source:

Petawawa

Source:

Renfrew

Source:

Whitewater Region

Source:

References

Renfrew
Politics of Renfrew County